The 2016 WNBA season was the season for the Phoenix Mercury of the WNBA.

Transactions

WNBA Draft

Standings

Regular season 

|- style=
| 1
| May 14
| 2016 Minnesota Lynx
| 
| 
| 
| 
| 
| 
|- style=
| 2
| May 18
| Indiana Fever
| 
| 
| 
| 
| 
| 
|- style=
| 3
| May 20
| Seattle Storm
| 
| 
| 
| 
| 
| 
|- style=
| 4
| May 25
| Minnesota Lynx
| 
| 
| 
| 
| 
| 
|- style=
| 5
| May 29
| Washington Mystics
| 
| 
| 
| 
| 
| 
|- style=
| 6
| May 31
| 
| 
| 
| 
| 
| 
| 

|- style=
| 6
| 
| 
| 
| 
| 
| 
| 
| 
|- style=
| 7
| 
| 
| 
| 
| 
| 
| 
| 
|- style=
| 8
| 
| 
| 
| 
| 
| 
| 
| 
|- style=
| 9
| 
| 
| 
| 
| 
| 
| 
| 
|- style=
| 10
| 
| 
| 
| 
| 
| 
| 
|
|- style=
| 11
| 
| 
| 
| 
| 
| 
| 
| 
|- style=
| 12
| 
| 
| 
| 
| 
| 
| 
| 
|- style=
| 12
| 
| 
| 
| 
| 
| 
| 
| 
|- style=
| 13
| 
| 
| 
| 
| 
| 
| 
|

Playoffs
The Phoenix Mercury finished eighth in the WNBA (with a record of 16–18), grabbing the final playoff spot.  The Mercury advanced to the semifinal after dispatching the Indiana Fever in round one and the New York Liberty in round two.  The Minnesota Lynx then swept the Mercury in the semifinal round, three games to none.

Transactions

Re-signed

Additions

Awards

References

External links
The Official Site of the Phoenix Mercury

Phoenix Mercury seasons
Phoenix
Phoenix Mercury